Mary Elizabeth has been the given name of many famous women. This name was used in reference to the Visitation of Saint Mary to Saint Elizabeth.

Real life
Mary Elizabeth Barber (1818–1899), British natural historian
Mary Elizabeth Biden (1894–1943), grandmother of Joe Biden
Mary Elizabeth Bliss (1824–1909), daughter of Zachary Taylor
Mary Elizabeth Braddon (1835–1915), British novelist
Mary Elizabeth Coleridge (1861–1907), British novelist and poet
Mary Elizabeth Counselman (1911–1995), American short story writer and poet
Mary Elizabeth Ellis (b. 1979), American television actress and screenwriter
Mary Elizabeth "Tipper" Gore (b. 1948), former Second Lady of the United States
Mary Elizabeth Lease (1850–1933), American activist
Mary Elizabeth Nelson, a wife of Brigham Young 
Mary Elizabeth Rollins, another wife of Brigham Young 
Mary Elizabeth Mastrantonio (b. 1958), American actress
Mary Elizabeth McDonough (b. 1961), American actress
Mary Elizabeth McGlynn (b. 1966), American voice actress
Mary Elizabeth Williams, American columnist
Mary Elizabeth "Liz" Truss (b. 1975), Prime Minister of the United Kingdom
Mary Elizabeth Ellis (b. 1979), American actress
Mary Elizabeth Winstead (b. 1984), American actress

Fictional characters
Mary Elizabeth Bartowski, a character on the television show Chuck

See also
Mary (given name)
Elizabeth (given name)

Compound given names